Sören Seidel (born 10 October 1972) is a German former professional footballer who played as a midfielder or forward.

Post-playing career
From 2013 to 2014, Seidel was manager of Heeslinger SC who at the time played in the German sixth-tier Landesliga Lüneburg.

Honours
Werder Bremen
 DFB-Pokal finalist: 1999–2000
 DFB-Ligapokal finalist: 1999

References

External links
 
 
 

1972 births
Living people
German footballers
Footballers from Düsseldorf
Association football midfielders
Bundesliga players
2. Bundesliga players
Atlas Delmenhorst players
SV Werder Bremen players
SV Werder Bremen II players
Hannover 96 players
MSV Duisburg players
Holstein Kiel players
SC Preußen Münster players
Borussia Mönchengladbach II players
SV Lippstadt 08 players
West German footballers